Li Nan may refer to:

 Li Nan (actor), Chinese actor in the 1998 TV series My Fair Princess
 Li Nan (basketball) (born 1974), Chinese basketball coach and former player
 Li Nan (footballer), Chinese female footballer in 2005 AFC U-17 Women's Championship
 Li Nan (freestyle skier), Chinese freestyle skier participated in the freestyle skiing at the 2011 Asian Winter Games
 Li Nan (table tennis) (born 1982), Chinese female table tennis player

See also 
 Linan, Fujian (鲤南镇), a town in Xianyou County, Fujian Province